DJ-Kicks: DJ Koze is a DJ mix album, mixed by DJ Koze. It was released on June 15, 2015 under the Studio !K7 independent record label as part of their DJ-Kicks series.

Track listing

References

External links
 DJ-Kicks website

DJ-Kicks albums
2015 compilation albums